Austroaeschna eungella is a species of dragonfly in the family Telephlebiidae, 
known as the Eungella darner. 
It is found in the vicinity of Eungella National Park in North Queensland, Australia, where it inhabits rocky streams in the rainforest.

Austroaeschna eungella is a black or brown dragonfly with pale markings. It resembles the dark forest darner, Austroaeschna pulchra, which is found further south from near Brisbane through to Victoria.

Gallery

See also
 List of dragonflies of Australia

References

Telephlebiidae
Odonata of Australia
Endemic fauna of Australia
Taxa named by Günther Theischinger
Insects described in 1993